Stenidea lateralis is a species of beetle in the family Cerambycidae. It was described by Per Olof Christopher Aurivillius in 1908 and is known from Namibia.

References

Endemic fauna of Namibia
lateralis
Beetles described in 1908